Joseph Porter Ruben (born May 10, 1950) is an American filmmaker.

Movie career
His earlier films, such as The Stepfather, have become cult classics. In the 1990s, he went to direct high-grossing mainstream films such as Sleeping with the Enemy starring Julia Roberts (which grossed over $150,000,000 at the box office), the controversial thriller The Good Son starring Macaulay Culkin and Elijah Wood, Money Train starring Woody Harrelson and Wesley Snipes, and Return to Paradise starring Vince Vaughn and Joaquin Phoenix. He frequently collaborates with film editor George Bowers.
He has won awards at various film festivals for his films The Stepfather, True Believer, starring Robert Downey Jr. and James Woods, and Dreamscape, starring Dennis Quaid. His 2013 feature, Penthouse North, stars Michael Keaton and Michelle Monaghan. He will return to direct the serial killer thriller Jack after not working for six years. Ruben is also attached to direct the film The Politician's Wife written by Nicholas Meyer.

The Ottoman Lieutenant was released around the period of the film The Promise, a film depicting the Armenian genocide. The perceived similarities between the films resulted in accusations that The Ottoman Lieutenant existed to deny the Armenian genocide.

Filmography

References

External links
 
 
 

1950 births
American male screenwriters
American people of German descent
American people of German-Jewish descent
American people of Jewish descent
Jewish American atheists
Film directors from New York (state)
Film producers from New York (state)
Screenwriters from New York (state)
Horror film directors
Living people
People from Briarcliff Manor, New York